Solomon House may refer to:

in the United States

Solomon Roadhouse, Solomon, Alaska, listed on the National Register of Historic Places (NRHP)
Solomon-Curd House, Macon, Georgia, NRHP-listed in Bibb County
Solomon-Smith-Martin House, Macon, Georgia, NRHP-listed in Bibb County
Solomon House (Philadelphia, Pennsylvania), NRHP-listed

See also
Solomon's House, a fictional location in Sir Francis Bacon's Utopia